East of Ealing is a novel by Robert Rankin published in 1984. It is the third novel in Rankin's Brentford Trilogy.

Plot summary
East of Ealing is a novel in which the plot features perpetual motion, robots, time travel, Merlin, Sherlock Holmes and a microchip Antichrist.

Reception
Dave Langford reviewed East of Ealing for White Dwarf #54, and stated that "its best feature is the very funny dialogue of heroes Pooley and Omally and I laughed like a drain at (eg) their appalled discovery that Eden was in Brentford, Babylon in Chiswick, and the Virgin Mary's birthplace in Penge."

Reviews
Review by Lynne Bispham (1993) in Vector 172

References

1984 British novels